What We Have Sown (2007) is the sixth album by The Pineapple Thief, recorded over the span of eight weeks during the development of Tightly Unwound (compare with 8 Days and 8 Days Later). The record was released through Cyclops Records as a "thank you" to the label for supporting the band before their departure for Kscope.

Most of the album's songs are holdovers from earlier albums; "All You Need to Know" was written for 10 Stories Down, and "Well, I Think That's What You Said?" (formerly titled "Blood on Your Hands") and "Take Me with You" are outtakes from Little Man.

Track listing

References

The Pineapple Thief albums
2007 albums